Nagarjuna Pradhan is an Indian politician from the Indian National Congress, who was elected in 1980 from the G. Udayagiri (Odisha Vidhan Sabha constituency) at G. Udayagiri in the state of Orissa.

Career

1980 elections
In the 1980 Odisha Legislative Assembly election, Pradhan won the G Udaygiri seat, defeating the sitting Member of the Legislative Assembly Ranjit Kumar Pradhan (Janata Party).

He won the elections four times in the following years. 
1980: (103): Nagarjuna Pradhan (Congress-I)
1985: (103): Nagarjuna Pradhan (Congress)
1990: (103): Nagarjuna Pradhan (Congress)
1995: (103): Nagarjuna Pradhan (Congress)

References

External links
Profile on Odishahelpline

Living people
Year of birth missing (living people)
People from Kandhamal district
Odisha MLAs 1995–2000
Indian National Congress politicians from Odisha
Odisha MLAs 1990–1995
Odisha MLAs 1980–1985
Odisha MLAs 1985–1990